Ján Zachar (born 1 December 1936) is a Slovak football coach and former player. He coached among others ŠK Slovan Bratislava and MFK Košice.

He coached VP Frýdek-Místek, Tatran Prešov, 1. FC Brno, Sparta Prague, Slovan Bratislava and Baník Ostrava.

References

1936 births
Slovak footballers
FK Fotbal Třinec players
Slovak football managers
Czechoslovak football managers
AC Sparta Prague managers
FC Baník Ostrava managers
FC Zbrojovka Brno managers
FC VSS Košice managers
Living people
1. FC Tatran Prešov managers
ŠK Slovan Bratislava managers
Association footballers not categorized by position